Piotrowo (derived from the name Piotr, "Peter") may refer to the following places in Poland:
Piotrowo, part of the Nowe Miasto district of Poznań
Piotrowo, Oborniki County in Greater Poland Voivodeship (west-central Poland)
Piotrowo, Słupca County in Greater Poland Voivodeship (west-central Poland)
Piotrowo, Szamotuły County in Greater Poland Voivodeship (west-central Poland)
Piotrowo, Śrem County in Greater Poland Voivodeship (west-central Poland)
Piotrowo, Nakło County in Kuyavian-Pomeranian Voivodeship (north-central Poland)
Piotrowo, Włocławek County in Kuyavian-Pomeranian Voivodeship (north-central Poland)
Piotrowo, Łódź Voivodeship (central Poland)
Piotrowo, Masovian Voivodeship (east-central Poland)
Piotrowo, Kartuzy County in Pomeranian Voivodeship (north Poland)
Piotrowo, Lębork County in Pomeranian Voivodeship (north Poland)
Piotrowo, Nowy Dwór Gdański County in Pomeranian Voivodeship (north Poland)
Piotrowo, Warmian-Masurian Voivodeship (north Poland)